The women's 3 metre springboard diving competition at the 2016 Summer Olympics in Rio de Janeiro took place from 12 to 14 August at the Maria Lenk Aquatic Center in Barra da Tijuca.

Format 
The competition was held in three rounds:
 Preliminary round: All 29 divers performed five dives; the top 18 divers advanced to the semi-final.
 Semi-final: The 18 divers performed five dives; the scores of the qualifications were erased and the top 12 divers advance to the final.
 Final: The 12 divers performed five dives; the semi-final scores were erased and the top three divers win the gold, silver and bronze medals accordingly.

Schedule 
All times are Brasília time (UTC−3)

Results 

Diving at the 2016 Summer Olympics
2016
Olymp
Women's events at the 2016 Summer Olympics